Archimedes's cattle problem (or the  or ) is a problem in Diophantine analysis, the study of polynomial equations with integer solutions. Attributed to Archimedes, the problem involves computing the number of cattle in a herd of the sun god from a given set of restrictions. The problem was discovered by Gotthold Ephraim Lessing in a Greek manuscript containing a poem of 44 lines, in the Herzog August Library in Wolfenbüttel, Germany in 1773.

The problem remained unsolved for a number of years, due partly to the difficulty of computing the huge numbers involved in the solution. Using logarithmic tables, he calculated the first digits of the smallest solution, showing that it is about  cattle, far more than could fit in the observable universe. The decimal form is too long for humans to calculate exactly, but multiple-precision arithmetic packages on computers can write it out explicitly.

History
In 1769, Gotthold Ephraim Lessing was appointed librarian of the Herzog August Library in Wolfenbüttel, Germany, which contained many Greek and Latin manuscripts. A few years later, Lessing published translations of some of the manuscripts with commentaries. Among them was a Greek poem of forty-four lines, containing an arithmetical problem which asks the reader to find the number of cattle in the herd of the god of the sun. It is now generally credited to Archimedes.

Problem
The problem, as translated into English by Ivor Thomas, states:
If thou art diligent and wise, O stranger, compute the number of cattle of the Sun, who once upon a time grazed on the fields of the Thrinacian isle of Sicily, divided into four herds of different colours, one milk white, another a glossy black, a third yellow and the last dappled. In each herd were bulls, mighty in number according to these proportions: Understand, stranger, that the white bulls were equal to a half and a third of the black together with the whole of the yellow, while the black were equal to the fourth part of the dappled and a fifth, together with, once more, the whole of the yellow. Observe further that the remaining bulls, the dappled, were equal to a sixth part of the white and a seventh, together with all of the yellow. These were the proportions of the cows: The white were precisely equal to the third part and a fourth of the whole herd of the black; while the black were equal to the fourth part once more of the dappled and with it a fifth part, when all, including the bulls, went to pasture together. Now the dappled in four parts were equal in number to a fifth part and a sixth of the yellow herd. Finally the yellow were in number equal to a sixth part and a seventh of the white herd. If thou canst accurately tell, O stranger, the number of cattle of the Sun, giving separately the number of well-fed bulls and again the number of females according to each colour, thou wouldst not be called unskilled or ignorant of numbers, but not yet shalt thou be numbered among the wise.

But come, understand also all these conditions regarding the cattle of the Sun. When the white bulls mingled their number with the black, they stood firm, equal in depth and breadth, and the plains of Thrinacia, stretching far in all ways, were filled with their multitude. Again, when the yellow and the dappled bulls were gathered into one herd they stood in such a manner that their number, beginning from one, grew slowly greater till it completed a triangular figure, there being no bulls of other colours in their midst nor none of them lacking. If thou art able, O stranger, to find out all these things and gather them together in your mind, giving all the relations, thou shalt depart crowned with glory and knowing that thou hast been adjudged perfect in this species of wisdom.

Solution
The first part of the problem can be solved readily by setting up a system of equations.

which is a system of seven equations with eight unknowns. It is indeterminate and has infinitely many solutions. The least positive integers satisfying the seven equations are

which is a total of  cattle, and the other solutions are integral multiples of these. Note that given the prime number  then the first four numbers are multiples of p, and both p and p+1 will appear repeatedly below.

The general solution to this part of the problem was first found by A. Amthor in 1880. The following version of it was described by H. W. Lenstra, based on Pell's equation: the solution given above for the first part of the problem should be multiplied by

where j is any positive integer and

Equivalently, squaring w results in

where  is the fundamental solution of the Pell equation

Modern computers can easily print out all digits of the answer. This was first done at the University of Waterloo, in 1965 by Hugh C. Williams, R. A. German, and Charles Robert Zarnke. They used a combination of the IBM 7040 and IBM 1620 computers.

Pell equation
The constraints of the second part of the problem are straightforward and the actual Pell equation that needs to be solved can easily be given. First, it one asks that B + W should be a square, or using the values given above,

thus one should set k = (3)(11)(29)(4657)q2 for some integer q. That solves the first condition. For the second, it requires that D + Y should be a triangular number:

Solving for t,

Substituting the value of D + Y and k and finding a value of q2 such that the discriminant of this quadratic is a perfect square p2 entails solving the Pell equation

The fundamental solution of this equation has more than 100,000 decimal digits.

References

Further reading

External links
—Complete decimal solution to the second problem

Diophantine equations
Large integers
Works by Archimedes
Cattle in literature